Rowan "Porridge" Benjamin is an Antiguan and Barbudan manager of the Antigua and Barbuda national team. He is currently the technical director of the All Saints United Football Club, the 2013-2014 champions of the Premier Division in Antigua.

Career
Since 2008 until 2011 he coached national team.

References

External links
 Profile at Soccerway.com
 Profile at Soccerpunter.com

Year of birth missing (living people)
Living people
Antigua and Barbuda football managers
Antigua and Barbuda national football team managers